Olympia București was a football club based in Bucharest, in southern Romania. It was founded in 1904 and it soon became one of the best teams in the country, winning two Romanian Championships. The club was dissolved in 1946.

History

The first football club from Bucharest, founded in October 1904 by young foreigners and a few Romanians from which we can mention: M. Gebauer, L. Breyer, Th. Davilla, the Grunberg brothers, prof. Ioanide, Szalay, Mendel. The club's first president was Mario Gebauer, Lazăr Breyer was the secretary, and capitan of the team Gh. Viereck. The football pitch was the one from Bolta rece (near the Triumphal arch today).

The team participated at the Herzog Cup along with Colentina București and United Ploieşti, a competition equivalent with the Romanian Championship, the predecessor of the Liga I. It succeeds to win the first two editions, in 1909–10 and 1910–11. Part of the team that participated at this performance: Gebauer – Hartman, Winter, L. Breyer, Davilla, Kemeny, Grunberg, Hart, Niculescu, Apostolescu, Bărbulescu (First 11). Beside them: Roman, Cominovici, Mincu, G. Vraca, C. Rădulescu, the Brebeţeanu brothers, the Volvoreanu brothers, Miti Niculescu, Şuţu, Drăghici, G. Dragomirescu, Ţane Săvulescu.

In 1915, the club fell apart, a part of the players go to rugby, and a part, in front with L. Breyer go to Colentina București.

After World War I, the club bounces back and starting with 1921 participates at the Bucharest Regional Championship. During the pre-divisionary period, the team succeeds only once to pass the regional phase, in 1927–28, and qualifies for the national championship, but reaches only the quarter-finals, being eliminated by Colţea Braşov (1–3). After the Romanian football passes to the divisionary system, the club plays for one season in Liga III in 1937–38 and for one season in Liga II in 1940–41.

After World War II, the club reappears in the Bucharest District Championship under the name of Olympia-Rheim, after which is dissolved, leaving behind the fame of the neighbourhood, of the ACSA (Belu) football pitch, inaugurated in 1927 and of three generation of players: First one, 1925–1937 with M. Cruţescu, E. Kroner, Robe, Subăşeanu, Taciuc; Second one, 1938–1944, with Sucitulescu, V. Stănescu, Catană, Panait, Ion Vasile, Aştilean, Gică Nicolae, Gain, Fabian, C. Rădulescu-Jumate, C. Siomionescu; And the third one (the last) we see: Voinescu I, Voinescu II, Al. Ene, Călinoiu, Titi Popescu, Ciocea, the Medrea brothers, Gheorghiu, Andreescu, Jipa.

Honours

Liga I:
Winners (2): 1909–10, 1910–11

References

Association football clubs established in 1904
Association football clubs disestablished in 1946
Defunct football clubs in Romania
Liga II clubs
Football clubs in Bucharest
History of Bucharest
1904 establishments in Romania
1946 disestablishments in Romania